Brahmananda may refer to:

 Brahmananda Panda (1949–2010), Indian politician
 Brahmananda Saraswati (1871–1953), Indian gurudeva and monk 
 Brahmanand Swami (1772–1832), Hindu saint from India
 Brahmananda Swami Sivayogi (1852–1929), Indian writer and social reformer
 Swami Brahmananda (1863–1922), disciple of Sri Ramakrishna

See also
 
 Brahmanandam